The Sandy River and Rangeley Lakes Railroad (SR&RL) was a  narrow gauge common carrier railroad that operated approximately  of track in Franklin County, Maine.  Former equipment from the SR&RL continues to operate in the present day on a revived, short segment of the railway in Phillips, Maine.

History
Josiah L. Maxey, a Gardiner banker who had recently financed construction of the Kennebec Central Railroad, obtained legislative approval for consolidation of the Sandy River Railroad and Phillips & Rangeley Railroad (P&R) on 10 March 1891. Maxcy purchased controlling stock of the Sandy River Railroad in 1892, and then obtained controlling stock of the Franklin & Megantic Railway (F&M) in 1897. Under Maxey's direction, F&M purchased the Kingfield and Dead River Railway (K&DR) at auction on 2 August 1898; and the F&M, K&DR, and Sandy River railroads operated under common management until formally merged as the SR&RL in January 1908. Under Maxcy's direction, SR&RL purchased the Phillips & Rangeley Railroad (P&R) and the Madrid Railroad at auction on 12 June 1908  and the Eustis Railroad at auction on 24 August 1911.

Maine Central control

As part of the New England transportation monopoly organized by the New York, New Haven & Hartford Railroad, the SR&RL operated as a subsidiary of the Maine Central Railroad from 1912 until receivership in 1923. Maine Central built 37 box cars, 37 flat cars, 3 cabooses and a baggage-RPO car in their Portland Terminal Company shops for the SR&RL between 1912 and 1917. SR&RL locomotives 15, 16, 17 and 18 were reboilered in the Maine Central Waterville shops during the same period, and a  freight branch was built from Perham Junction to Barnjum.

Outbound lumber traffic declined from 50,000 tons in 1906  to 11,000 tons in 1919.  Pulpwood traffic increased as smaller spruce trees were harvested. The Phillips shop converted two-thirds of the flat cars for loading with 4-foot-long (1.2 meter) pulpwood logs by installing high, slatted sides and ends loosely resembling a stock car with doors and roof removed.

Federal railway post office service between Farmington and Phillips ended 13 March 1917. Freight traffic peaked at 157,809 tons in 1919; but 84 percent of that freight was pulpwood, and demand for pulpwood declined dramatically when federal paper contracts were canceled at the end of World War I.  1919 was the last year of service on the three miles of the former Eustis Railroad beyond Langtown.

Various curtailments of winter service were tried over the following years to reduce operating costs. Winter service was discontinued on the former K&DR north of Kingfield from 21 December 1921 to 1 May 1922. Winter service on the former P&R was discontinued from 15 December 1922 to 1 May 1923.  Eight of the railroad's thirteen operational locomotives were damaged when the Phillips roundhouse burned on 12 February 1923. Josiah Maxey and Kingfield mill and hotel owner Herbert Wing were appointed receivers when bond interest went unpaid.

Receivership
The receivers took control on 8 July 1923 and discontinued freight service north of Perham Junction on the former P&R from 24 November 1923 until 1 June 1924, but passenger train service was continued over the entire system through that winter. For the next five years, winter freight and passenger service on the former P&R north of Phillips was discontinued from December through May. The former F&M remained in service for receiver Wing's mill in Kingfield, and for a Carrabasset wood veneer mill built by the Lawrence Plywood Company in 1924. The veneer mill used surplus World War I tanks to haul logs out of the woods.

The Phillips shop built internal combustion railcars numbered 3 and 4 in the spring of 1925. These passenger rail motors substituted for steam passenger trains during the summer months until October when snow and ice removal required daily operation of steam locomotives with pony plows.  Railcar number 5 was built during the winter of 1926-27.

Rails were removed from the 1.9-mile (3-km) Mount Abram Branch to Soule's Mill in November 1924  and from the northern 4.4 miles (7 kilometers) of the former K&DR from Carrabasset to Bigelow in the summer of 1926. In 1927, rails were removed from the P&R extension formerly serving the Rangeley Lake House hotel.

In 1928 Oxford Paper Company began shipping pulpwood from Barnjum to their mill in Rumford Falls. The receivers operated extra winter trains to Barnjum, and were encouraged to resume full year service over the former P&R commencing 20 May 1929. The last steam train left Rangeley in May 1931 and railcar service over the former P&R north of Phillips ended in the autumn of 1931.  Following a precedent set three years earlier on the Kennebec Central Railroad, Maxey suspended all train and railcar service when the last mills shipping their products via the SR&RL transferred their business to highway trucking firms. Two SR&RL highway trucks began carrying express shipments on 8 July 1932, and no trains operated over any part of the railroad through the following winter.

Dismantling
After observing reliability of winter truck traffic over Maine State Route 16, the Lawrence Plywood Company petitioned the railroad to resume service from their Carrabasset mill to Farmington.  Operations resumed on 17 April 1933, with sale of unused equipment as scrap to meet operating costs.  Dismantling of the former P&R began during the summer of 1934, but service to Phillips was required to reach the railroad machine shops; so the receivers petitioned for abandonment when rail removal reached Phillips in April 1935.  A scrap metal firm purchased the railroad at auction in May and service ended on 2 July 1935. Remaining rails were lifted for scrap metal in 1936.

Revival

In 1970 a group of local railfans at the Phillips Historical Society formed a project to document the SR&RL. This group eventually formed a separate non-profit organization, the "Sandy River and Rangeley Lakes Railroad", to preserve remaining equipment from the railroad. The non-profit continues to operate, as of 2019, a short heritage railroad on the trackbed of the original SR&RL at Phillips.

Locomotives

See also
 Maine Narrow Gauge Railroad Co. & Museum
 Brecon Mountain Railway
 Sandy River and Rangeley Lakes Railroad - heritage operation in Phillips

Notes

References
 
 
 
 
 
 
 
  1895–1914.

External links
 Sandy River & Rangeley Lakes Railroad web site

Defunct Maine railroads
Heritage railroads in Maine
Maine logging railroads
Narrow gauge railroads in Maine
2 ft gauge railways in the United States
Railway companies established in 1908
Railway companies disestablished in 1935
1908 establishments in Maine
1930s disestablishments in Maine
Museums in Franklin County, Maine
Railroad museums in Maine
Phillips, Maine